Between is a Canadian science fiction drama television series which debuted May 21, 2015 on Citytv. Created by Michael McGowan, the series stars Jennette McCurdy as Wiley Day, a pregnant teenage daughter of a minister living in the small town of Pretty Lake, which is coping with a mysterious disease that has killed everybody over the age of 22.

The series is a co-production between Citytv and Netflix, which distributes the series outside Canada as a Netflix Original Series. The series was renewed for a second season on July 8, 2015, which premiered on June 30, 2016. Though the series was never officially cancelled, no news has been released about the series since the last episode of the second season aired on August 4, 2016.

Plot 
Between is the story of a small town called Pretty Lake and surrounding rural area under siege from a mysterious disease that has wiped out everybody aged 22 and older. The series also explores numerous themes: the power vacuum that results when the government quarantines a 10 square mile zone and leaves the inhabitants to fend for themselves; the desire of inhabitants to escape, ignoring that they will spread the deadly disease to the entire planet; and the effect of hormonal teenaged/young adult angst becoming the guiding force for an entire community.

Cast and characters

Main 

 Jennette McCurdy as Wiley Day
 Jesse Carere as Adam Jones
 Ryan Allen as Gord
 Justin Kelly as Chuck Lott Jr.
 Kyle Mac as Ronnie Creeker
 Jack Murray as Mark
 Brooke Palsson as Melissa Day (season 1)
 Stephen Bogaert as Charles Lott Sr., Chuck's father (season 1)
 Samantha Munro as Stacey
 Rick Roberts as Clarence Jones, Adam's father (season 1)
 Steven Grayhm as Liam Cullen (season 2)
 Percy Hynes White as Harrison (guest season 1, main season 2)
 Mercedes Morris as Renee Tofoli (season 2)
 Shailyn Pierre-Dixon as Frances (recurring season 1, main season 2)
 Jordan Todosey as Tracey Creeker (recurring season 1, main season 2)
 Rosemary Dunsmore as Minister Miller (recurring season 1, main season 2)
 Pascal Langdale as Dexter Crane (season 2)

Recurring 
 Krystal Nausbaum as Amanda Lott (season 1)
 Niamh Wilson as Lana Lott (season 1)
 Shailene Garnett as Ms. Amy Symonds (season 1)
 Jim Watson as Pat Creeker
 Lucius Hoyos as McCalister
 Abigail Winter as Samantha
 Jesse Bostick as Felix
 Wesley Morgan as Kevin (season 1)
 Canute Gomes as Vince (season 1)
 Sarah Podemski as Ellen (season 1)
 Rebecca Liddiard as Hanna
 Ian Fisher as John
 Leanne Miller as Helen (season 2)
 Alexander de Jordy as Lamar (season 2)
 Drew Davis as Eric Tofoli (season 2)

Episodes

Season 1 (2015)

Season 2 (2016)

Production 
The series was originally set for a season of six one-hour episodes, co-produced and financed by Citytv and Netflix as part of a collaboration deal. The series represents the first major television solo starring role for McCurdy.

Production of season 1 began on October 20, 2014. Citytv aired an exclusive preview of the series during their broadcast of the 57th Annual Grammy Awards, and the series premiered on May 21, 2015.

Jesse Carere was promoted to managing director for season 2. Production of season 2 began in January 2016, with six one-hour episodes like the first season. The series shot through March 11, 2016, with two new characters, Liam (played by Steven Grayhm) and Renee (played by Mercedes Morris).

Web series

Between the Lines 
As an accompaniment to the show, a web series called Between the Lines has been released, featuring eight two-minute webisodes. The web series follows the character Amanda as she interviews students at Pretty Lake High as an assignment for the school's yearbook. The series begins pre-outbreak, and continues throughout the quarantine and ensuing chaos, taking an in-depth look at a different character each week. The first installment of the web series was posted on May 22, 2015, with new webisodes made available every week on CityTV.com, after each TV episode broadcasts. The season 2 edition of the web series, a six-part video diary kept by Wiley and Adam, became available on June 23, 2016.

Inside Between 
In addition, season 2 includes an after-show web component called Inside Between, hosted by Angelina LeDrew-Bonvarlez and Nicole Stamp and streaming live (then remaining available) on CityTV.com's Between page, directly following each TV episode's initial broadcast on City.

Broadcast 
Per the collaboration deal, the series airs terrestrially on City, and streams on Shomi in Canada and Netflix internationally. It is the first series originating from Canada to air on Netflix from its inception.

Episodes air on a week by week basis on City, on Thursdays at 8 pm Eastern Time. During season 1, they were later added on week by week basis on Netflix, for international viewing at 11:30 pm Eastern. Season 1 was added to Netflix's Canadian service one year after its Shomi debut. For season 2, all six episodes were released on Netflix on July 1, 2016, outside Canada.

Ratings 
Betweens season 1 ratings on Citytv pulled a combined 3.2 million viewers, reaching roughly 10% of the Canadian population. The show performed at 31% in the desirable 18–34 age demographic, significantly above the channel average of 19% for the demographic.

Reception 
Rotten Tomatoes reports a 22% approval rating with an average rating of 4.3/10, based on 18 critic reviews. The website's critics consensus reads, "A poorly acted regurgitation of post-apocalyptic cliches, Between falls short of Netflix's other high quality offerings." On the review aggregator Metacritic, the series has a weighted average score of 47 out of 100 based on 10 critics, indicating "mixed or average".

Brian Lowry of Variety called Between "an utterly ho-hum addition to Netflix's original lineup". Keith Uhlich of The Hollywood Reporter wrote, "It's the end of the world as they know it, and viewers won't care." Mike Hale of The New York Times called it a "familiar ensemble soap opera with conspiracy-theory embroidery". Mary McNamara of the Los Angeles Times wrote, "The town is lovely, the premise solid if overfamiliar, but the script lacks both depth and tension (big problem), and McCurdy is one of the few cast members who can act." Kevin P. Sullivan of Entertainment Weekly rated it C− and criticized the show's writing. Joshua Alston of The A.V. Club rated it C+ and wrote that the series lacks a compelling hook.

See also 
The Girl Who Owned a City (1975), a United States post-apocalyptic novel by O.T. Nelson detailing a pandemic which killed off anyone over the age of 12.
Empty World (1977), a United Kingdom post-apocalyptic novel by John Christopher where a plague kills off all the adults.
 The Tribe (1999 TV series), a New Zealand post-apocalyptic television series where the adult population has been wiped out by a deadly virus and the kids become warring tribes.
Jeremiah (TV series), a United States-Canada post-apocalyptic television series where the adult population has been wiped out by a deadly virus.
Gone (novel series) (2008), a United States post-apocalyptic novel series by Michael Grant where anyone over the age of 15 disappear mysteriously.
The Sparticle Mystery (2011), a United Kingdom post-apocalyptic television series detailing an experiment that made anyone over the age of 15 disappear mysteriously.
The Society (TV series) (2019), a United States post-apocalyptic television series where only a group of teenagers remain after their entire town disappear mysteriously.

References

External links 
 
 Inside Between at IMDb 

2010s Canadian drama television series
2015 Canadian television series debuts
2016 Canadian television series endings
2010s Canadian science fiction television series
Canadian drama web series
Citytv original programming
English-language Netflix original programming
Serial drama television series
Teenage pregnancy in television
Television series about viral outbreaks